The 2004–05 Buffalo Bulls men's basketball team represented the University at Buffalo during the 2004–05 NCAA Division I men's basketball season. The Bulls, led by sixth-year head coach Reggie Witherspoon, played their home games at Alumni Arena in Amherst, New York as members of the Mid-American Conference (MAC). They finished the season 23–10, 11–7 in MAC play to finish in fifth place in the MAC East. It was the first 20-win season in the school's NCAA Division I history.

They reached the finals of the MAC men's basketball tournament for the first time in school history and at one point held a 19-point lead but ultimately lost to Ohio after a last-second tip-in in overtime. They were also invited to the National Invitation Tournament for the first time in program history and won their opening-round game against Drexel.

Writing for the Associated Press, Tom Withers described it as "Buffalo's dream season."

Following the season, Buffalo guard Turner Battle became the first Bull in program history to be named an Academic All-American, an Honorable Mention All-American, the MAC Men's Basketball Player of the Year and to the All-MAC First Team. Battle and Yassin Idbihi became the first Bulls in program history to be named to the MAC All-Tournament Team. Mark Bortz became the first Bull in program history to be named the MAC Sixth Man of the Year.

Previous season
The Bulls finished the 2003–04 season with an overall record of 17–12 and a record of 11–7 in conference play. It was their first winning season since having joined the MAC for the 1998–99 season. In spite of that, they lost in the second round of the 2004 MAC tournament. Eleven of the thirteen players from the 2003–04 season, including the eleven who appeared in the most games for the 2003–04 team, returned for the 2004–05 season.

Departures

Roster

Schedule

|-
!colspan=6 style=| Regular season

|-
!colspan=6 style=| 2005 MAC Men's Basketball Tournament

|-
!colspan=6 style=| 2005 National Invitation Tournament

References

Buffalo Bulls men's basketball seasons
Buffalo
Buffalo
Buffalo Bulls men's basketball
Buffalo Bulls men's basketball